S304 may refer to :
 HNoMS Uthaug (S304), a Norwegian Ula class sub-marine
 DiMAGE S304, a Minolta camera
 S304 (6'13"), a No Warning song on Suffer, Survive album